The 1979 Air Canada Silver Broom, the men's world curling championship, was held from March 26–April 1 at the Allmend Eisstadion in Bern, Switzerland.

Teams

Round-robin standings

Round-robin results

Draw 1

Draw 2

Draw 3

Draw 4

Draw 5

Draw 6

Draw 7

Draw 8

Draw 9

Tiebreakers

Tiebreaker 1

Tiebreaker 2

Playoffs

Semifinals

Final

External links

World Men's Curling Championship
1979 in curling
1979 in Swiss sport
International curling competitions hosted by Switzerland
International sports competitions hosted by Switzerland
Sports competitions in Bern
20th century in Bern
March 1979 sports events in Europe
April 1979 sports events in Europe